The Army Group Böhm-Ermolli (German: Heeresgruppe Böhm-Ermolli) was an Army Group of the Austro-Hungarian Army, which operated on the Eastern Front against Russia, from 19 September 1915 to 25 July 1916 and again from 4 October 1916  to 24 January 1918 during World War I. It was commanded by Eduard von Böhm-Ermolli.

Composition September 1915 - July 1916 

 Austro-Hungarian 1st Army (Paul Puhallo von Brlog) 
 Austro-Hungarian 2nd Army (Eduard von Böhm-Ermolli)

Composition October 1916 - January 1918 

 Austro-Hungarian 2nd Army (Eduard von Böhm-Ermolli) 
 German South Army (Felix Graf von Bothmer) 
 Austro-Hungarian 3rd Army (Karl Graf von Kirchbach auf Lauterbach succeeded by Karl Tersztyánszky von Nádas and Karl Kritek), from July 1917.

Sources

 Austro-Hungarian Army, Higher Commands and Commanders 
 Deutsche biographie

Army groups of Austria-Hungary
Army units and formations of Austria-Hungary in World War I
1915 establishments in Austria-Hungary
Military units and formations established in 1915
Military units and formations disestablished in 1918